Cyclostrema solariellum is a species of sea snail, a marine gastropod mollusk in the family Liotiidae.

Description
The height of the shell attains 0.5 mm and its diameter 1.5 mm. The thin, whitish shell is depressed and a deep umbilicus. It contains four whorls with the last one rapidly increasing in size. The aperture is ovate. The outer lip is simple. It has a double row of gemmules on the lirae below the sutures, and at the base, around the umbilicus.

Distribution
This marine species occurs off Mumbai, India.

References

 Melvill J.C. (1893). Descriptions of twenty-five new species of marine shells from Bombay collected by Alexander Abercrombie, Esq.. Memoirs and Proceedings of the Manchester Literary and Philosophical Society 7: 52-67, 1 pl.
 Trew, A., 1984. The Melvill-Tomlin Collection. Part 30. Trochacea. Handlists of the Molluscan Collections in the Department of Zoology, National Museum of Wales.

External links
 To World Register of Marine Species

solariellum
Gastropods described in 1893